Mountain Creek is a suburb in the Sunshine Coast Region, Queensland, Australia.

Geography 
Mountain Creek was named after the creek of the same name that drains the southern slopes of Buderim. It is tidal for a short distance and flows into the Mooloolah River above the Cod Hole and the Traffic Bridge on the Nicklin Way.

History
Mountain Creek State School opened on 1 January 1994.

Mountain Creek State High School opened on 27 January 1995.

Brightwater State School opened on 1 January 2012.

Education 

Mountain Creek State School is a government primary (Prep-6) school for boys and girls at Lady Musgrave Drive. In 2018, the school had an enrolment of 984 students with 68 teachers (59 full-time equivalent) and 48 non-teaching staff (31 full-time equivalent). It includes a special education program.

Brightwater State School is a government primary (Prep-6) school for boys and girls at 20 Dianella Drive. In 2018, the school had an enrolment of 1,055 students with 70 teachers (62 full-time equivalent) and 30 non-teaching staff (22 full-time equivalent). It includes a special education program.

Mountain Creek State High School is a government secondary (7-12) school for boys and girls at Lady Musgrave Drive. In 2018, the school had an enrolment of 2,111 students with 168 teachers (151 full-time equivalent) and 57 non-teaching staff (43 full-time equivalent). It includes a special education program.

Despite the name, the Mooloolaba campus of TAFE Queensland is at 34 Lady Musgrave Drive in Mountain Creek.

Amenities 
The Sunshine Coast Regional Council operates a mobile library service which visits Glenfields Boulevard near the park and Karawatha Drive near the shopping centre.

There are a number of parks in the area:

 Brightwater Community & Lake Park
 Brightwater Park
 Coomoo Crescent Park
 Cootamundra Drive Park
 Corkwood Circuit Park
 Dardgee Park
 Elsa Wilson Drive Walkway
 Frogmouth Circuit Park
 Glenfields Neighbourhood Park
 Holbrook Park
 Kawana Island Riparian Reserve
 Lady Musgrave Drive Walkway
 Loang Court Park
 Lurnea Crescent Park
 Mountain Ash Fire Break, Sauger Court
 Mountain Creek Lake 1 Park
 Mountain Creek Lake 2 Park
 Mountain Creek Rodd Corner Park
 Mountain Creek Riparian Reserve
 Mountain Creek Road Natural Amenity Reserve
 Parklea Esplanade Park
 Parragundi Park
 Philosophers Walk Reserve
 Photinia Crescent Park
 Pipi Place Park
 Prelude Drive Park
 Quota Hideaway Park
 Redbud Bushland Park
 Sailfish Drive Park
 Saratoga Drive Park
 Skua Place Park

References

External links
 

Suburbs of the Sunshine Coast Region
Buderim